The 2011–12 Quinnipiac Bobcats men's basketball team represented Quinnipiac University in the 2011–12 NCAA Division I men's basketball season. The Bobcats, led by head coach Tom Moore, played their home games at TD Bank Sports Center in Hamden, Connecticut, as members of the Northeast Conference. Quinnipiac finished 5th during the regular season, and advanced to the 2nd round of the  NEC tournament, where they were defeated by Long Island.

Quinnipiac failed to qualify for the NCAA tournament, but received a bid to the 2012 College Basketball Invitational. The Bobcats were eliminated in the first round of the CBI by Penn, 74–63.

Roster 

Source

Schedule and results

|-
!colspan=9 style=|Regular season

|-
!colspan=9 style=| NEC tournament

|-
!colspan=9 style=| CBI

Source

References

Quinnipiac Bobcats
Quinnipiac Bobcats men's basketball seasons
Quinnipiac
Quinnipiac
Quinnipiac